Californium (98Cf) is an artificial element, and thus a standard atomic weight cannot be given. Like all artificial elements, it has no stable isotopes. The first isotope to be synthesized was 245Cf in 1950. There are 20 known radioisotopes ranging from 237Cf to 256Cf and one nuclear isomer, 249mCf. The longest-lived isotope is 251Cf with a half-life of 898 years.

List of isotopes 

|-
| rowspan=3|237Cf
| rowspan=3 style="text-align:right" | 98
| rowspan=3 style="text-align:right" | 139
| rowspan=3|237.06207(54)#
| rowspan=3|2.1(3) s
| SF
| (various)
| rowspan=3|5/2+#
|-
| β+
| 237Bk
|-
| α
| 233Cm
|-
| rowspan=3|238Cf
| rowspan=3 style="text-align:right" | 98
| rowspan=3 style="text-align:right" | 140
| rowspan=3|238.06141(43)#
| rowspan=3|21.1(13) ms
| SF
| (various)
| rowspan=3|0+
|-
| β+ (rare)
| 238Bk
|-
| α (rare)
| 234Cm
|-
| rowspan=2|239Cf
| rowspan=2 style="text-align:right" | 98
| rowspan=2 style="text-align:right" | 141
| rowspan=2|239.06242(23)#
| rowspan=2|60(30) s[39(+37−12) s]
| α
| 235Cm
| rowspan=2|5/2+#
|-
| β+ (rare)
| 239Bk
|-
| rowspan=3|240Cf
| rowspan=3 style="text-align:right" | 98
| rowspan=3 style="text-align:right" | 142
| rowspan=3|240.06230(22)#
| rowspan=3|1.06(15) min
| α (98%)
| 236Cm
| rowspan=3|0+
|-
| SF (2%)
| (various)
|-
| β+ (rare)
| 240Bk
|-
| rowspan=2|241Cf
| rowspan=2 style="text-align:right" | 98
| rowspan=2 style="text-align:right" | 143
| rowspan=2|241.06373(27)#
| rowspan=2|3.78(70) min
| β+ (75%)
| 241Bk
| rowspan=2|7/2−#
|-
| α (25%)
| 237Cm
|-
| rowspan=3|242Cf
| rowspan=3 style="text-align:right" | 98
| rowspan=3 style="text-align:right" | 144
| rowspan=3|242.06370(4)
| rowspan=3|3.49(15) min
| α (80%)
| 238Cm
| rowspan=3|0+
|-
| β+ (20%)
| 242Bk
|-
| SF (.014%)
| (various)
|-
| rowspan=2|243Cf
| rowspan=2 style="text-align:right" | 98
| rowspan=2 style="text-align:right" | 145
| rowspan=2|243.06543(15)#
| rowspan=2|10.7(5) min
| β+ (86%)
| 243Bk
| rowspan=2|(1/2+)
|-
| α (14%)
| 239Cm
|-
| rowspan=2|244Cf
| rowspan=2 style="text-align:right" | 98
| rowspan=2 style="text-align:right" | 146
| rowspan=2|244.066001(3)
| rowspan=2|19.4(6) min
| α (99%)
| 240Cm
| rowspan=2|0+
|-
| EC (1%)
| 244Bk
|-
| rowspan=2|245Cf
| rowspan=2 style="text-align:right" | 98
| rowspan=2 style="text-align:right" | 147
| rowspan=2|245.068049(3)
| rowspan=2|45.0(15) min
| β+ (64%)
| 245Bk
| rowspan=2|(5/2+)
|-
| α (36%)
| 241Cm
|-
| rowspan=3|246Cf
| rowspan=3 style="text-align:right" | 98
| rowspan=3 style="text-align:right" | 148
| rowspan=3|246.0688053(22)
| rowspan=3|35.7(5) h
| α
| 242Cm
| rowspan=3|0+
|-
| EC (5×10−4%)
| 246Bk
|-
| SF (2×10−4%)
| (various)
|-
| rowspan=2|247Cf
| rowspan=2 style="text-align:right" | 98
| rowspan=2 style="text-align:right" | 149
| rowspan=2|247.071001(9)
| rowspan=2|3.11(3) h
| EC (99.96%)
| 247Bk
| rowspan=2|(7/2+)#
|-
| α (.04%)
| 243Cm
|-
| rowspan=2|248Cf
| rowspan=2 style="text-align:right" | 98
| rowspan=2 style="text-align:right" | 150
| rowspan=2|248.072185(6)
| rowspan=2|333.5(28) d
| α (99.99%)
| 244Cm
| rowspan=2|0+
|-
| SF (.0029%)
| (various)
|-
| rowspan=2|249Cf
| rowspan=2 style="text-align:right" | 98
| rowspan=2 style="text-align:right" | 151
| rowspan=2|249.0748535(24)
| rowspan=2|351(2) y
| α
| 245Cm
| rowspan=2|9/2−
|-
| SF (5×10−7%)
| (various)
|-
| style="text-indent:1em" | 249mCf
| colspan="3" style="text-indent:2em" | 144.98(5) keV
| 45(5) μs
|
|
| 5/2+
|-
| rowspan=2|250Cf
| rowspan=2 style="text-align:right" | 98
| rowspan=2 style="text-align:right" | 152
| rowspan=2|250.0764061(22)
| rowspan=2|13.08(9) y
| α (99.92%)
| 246Cm
| rowspan=2|0+
|-
| SF (.077%)
| (various)
|-
| 251Cf
| style="text-align:right" | 98
| style="text-align:right" | 153
| 251.079587(5)
| 900(40) y
| α
| 247Cm
| 1/2+
|-
| rowspan=2|252Cf
| rowspan=2 style="text-align:right" | 98
| rowspan=2 style="text-align:right" | 154
| rowspan=2|252.081626(5)
| rowspan=2|2.645(8) y
| α (96.9%)
| 248Cm
| rowspan=2|0+
|-
| SF (3.09%)
| (various)
|-
| rowspan=2|253Cf
| rowspan=2 style="text-align:right" | 98
| rowspan=2 style="text-align:right" | 155
| rowspan=2|253.085133(7)
| rowspan=2|17.81(8) d
| β− (99.69%)
| 253Es
| rowspan=2|(7/2+)
|-
| α (.31%)
| 249Cm
|-
| rowspan=3|254Cf
| rowspan=3 style="text-align:right" | 98
| rowspan=3 style="text-align:right" | 156
| rowspan=3|254.087323(13)
| rowspan=3|60.5(2) d
| SF (99.69%)
| (various)
| rowspan=3|0+
|-
| α (.31%)
| 250Cm
|-
| β−β− (rare)
| 254Fm
|-
| rowspan=3|255Cf
| rowspan=3 style="text-align:right" | 98
| rowspan=3 style="text-align:right" | 157
| rowspan=3|255.09105(22)#
| rowspan=3|85(18) min
| β− (99.99%)
| 255Es
| rowspan=3|(7/2+)
|-
| SF (.001%)
| (various)
|-
| α (10−5%)
| 251Cm
|-
| rowspan=3|256Cf
| rowspan=3 style="text-align:right" | 98
| rowspan=3 style="text-align:right" | 158
| rowspan=3|256.09344(32)#
| rowspan=3|12.3(12) min
| SF (~100%)
| (various)
| rowspan=3|0+
|-
| α (10−6%)
| 252Cm
|-
| β−β− (rare)
| 256Fm

Actinides vs fission products

Californium-252 

Californium-252 (Cf-252, 252Cf) undergoes spontaneous fission with a branching ratio of 3.09% and is used in small sized neutron sources. Fission neutrons have an energy range of 0 to 13 MeV with a mean value of 2.3 MeV and a most probable value of 1 MeV.

This isotope produces high neutron emissions and can be used for a number of applications in industries such as nuclear energy, medicine, and petrochemical exploration.

Nuclear reactors 
The neutron sources produced from 252Cf are most notably used in the start-up of nuclear reactors. Once a reactor is filled with nuclear fuel, the stable neutron emissions from the source material initiates the fission chain reaction.

Military and defense 
The portable isotopic neutron spectroscopy (PINS) used by United States Armed Forces, the National Guard, Homeland Security, and U.S. Customs and Border Protection, employs the use of 252Cf sources to detect hazardous contents found inside artillery projectiles, mortar projectiles, rockets, bombs, land mines, and improvised explosive devices (IED).

Oil and petroleum 
In the oil industry, 252Cf neutron sources are used to find layers of petroleum and water in a well. Instrumentation is lowered into the well which bombards the formation with high energy neutrons to determine porosity, permeability, and hydrocarbon presence along the length of the borehole.

Medicine 
Californium-252 has also been used in the treatment of serious forms of cancer. In patients with certain types of brain and cervical cancer, 252Cf can be used as a more cost-effective substitute for radium.

References 

 Isotope masses from:

 Isotopic compositions and standard atomic masses from:

 Half-life, spin, and isomer data selected from the following sources.

 
Californium
Californium